Bob Hoskins (born April 15, 1936) is an American Christian missionary, author, and the founder of OneHope (formerly Book of Hope International) in 1987. He has spent the majority of his life serving as a missionary in the Middle East, Africa, South America, Asia and Europe.

Early life
At 19, Hoskins met Hazel Crabtree at a church event where he was preaching in Little Rock, Arkansas. Four years later on September 5, 1959, they were married in a ceremony in Sacramento, California before leaving for the mission field abroad.

Career

Early ministry
In 1964, the Hoskins felt compelled to plant churches in the Middle East and North Africa.  The ministries they established under the name Middle East Outreach included correspondence courses, radio ministry, a seminary and the organizing of missionary outreach to that area of the world.

In 1965, Bob and Hazel moved to Beirut, Lebanon, where they lived and raised their three children. In the country, Bob launched The Way of Life Literature Ministry, which after 10 years, 400,000 people enrolled in their correspondence program.

Life Publishers International
After 15 years abroad, Hoskins returned to the United States with his family in 1980. They relocated to Miami, Florida, where Bob assumed the presidency of the newly formed Life Publishers International; a literature ministry. He continued in leadership at Life Publishers until 1996, when the denomination he was affiliated with sold the publishing entity to  Zondervan Publishers.

OneHope
In 1987, Hoskins launched Book of Hope International ministries. As the ministry expanded beyond print to digital media, the ministry was renamed OneHope. OneHope partners with local churches, ministries, local governments, and schools to share God's Story. Today, OneHope has reached more than 1.5 billion children and youth around the globe.

The first 968,000 Books of Hope—customized, Bible-based children's publications—were delivered in 1987 to every schoolchild in El Salvador at the request of the country's Minister of Education. The ministry grew exponentially as new opportunities around the world became available.

In 2004, Bob's son Rob Hoskins became president of OneHope and expanded its outreach through new media formats including films, digital programs, apps, and other platforms. OneHope also provides resources to partners ministering to illiterate or pre-literate children with programs such as The GodMan, an animated film about the life of Jesus and God's Big Story picture cards.

OneHope launched a multi-year, multi-country research initiative to examine the spiritual state of the world's children in 2007.  The data gathered from surveys of 153,652 school-aged children on 5 continents is being used to customize OneHope's programs and materials to each of the 44 countries’ unique cultural challenges.

OneHope and YouVersion partners to recite the Bible App for Kids, a free digital resource of interactive Bible stories, which launched in 2013 and has been translated into dozens of languages.

Publications
Hoskins has authored a number of books, including the classic, All They Want Is the Truth, which has been translated into multiple languages with over a million copies distributed.

 The Middle East and the Third World War (1982)
 All They Want Is the Truth (1985)
 The Destiny Changing Book (1986)
 They Still Want the Truth (1987)
 Russia, The Miracle of the Open Door (1991)
 Winning the Race for Russia (1992)
 Voices of Destiny (1993)
 Study War No More (1994)
 Affect Destiny (2003)
 The Indestructible Seed (2004)

Personal life
Hoskins has been recognized by several industry leaders because of his work around the world. In 2013, Bob Hoskins School in Angola launched and was named in his honor. In February 2014, Hoskins was honored with celebrations in the United States, Dubai, and India, for having completed 70 years of full-time ministry.

He is a founding board member of the Museum of the Bible, as well as Ambassador at Large for the 4/14 Movement.

Bob married his wife Hazel on September 5, 1959. Hazel was a 1954 alumnus of Central Bible College in Springfield, Missouri.

Immediately after marrying, Bob and Hazel begin their service as missionaries to the world, working on the continents of Africa and South America and in the mission fields of France and Lebanon. Hazel wrote a book about their experiences as missionaries in Africa called, Honeymoon Safari, which was released in 1963. The next ten years were spent traveling as missionary evangelists in Africa, Asia, and Latin America. Since founding OneHope, Hazel Hoskins, who was a partner in the ministry, worked closely with the organization, especially in ministry to girls and women. Hazel authored a book, …And I Sat There in February 2014. On June 22, 2015, Hazel died at the age of 81.

Bob remarried and currently resides in Hillsboro Beach, Florida with his wife, Helen. They travel together extensively, visiting partners of OneHope around the world. Hoskins has survived cancer 3 times and is also partially blind.

References

1936 births
Living people
People from Ponca City, Oklahoma
American philanthropists
American evangelists
People from Pompano Beach, Florida
People from Hillsboro Beach, Florida